Yakym Somko (? in Pereiaslav – September 28, 1664), was a Ukrainian Cossack military leader of the Pereyaslav regiment and was the Acting Hetman of Left-bank Ukraine in 1660-1663, during The Ruin.

He was first appointed captain of the Pereiaslav regiment in 1654, and became the acting colonel in 1658. At the Pereiaslav Council of 1660 that concluded the Treaty of Slobodyshche he was elected colonel of Pereiaslav regiment and Acting Hetman of Left-Bank Ukraine. But he strongly opposed the treaty because it restored the union with Poland, and annulled the Pereiaslav articles, which he favored more of a pro-Russian orientation. Which caused a civil war between Right-bank Cossacks who favored a pro-Polish policies, and Left-bank Cossacks who favored pro-Russian policies. In 1661 he led a revolt against Yuri Khmelnytsky with left-bank regiments, and Zaporozhian otaman Ivan Briukhovetsky.

During the Russo-Polish War he fought against the Poles, and the Crimean Tatars, in order to re-unite all of the Cossack lands under his reign. At first he was a strong supporter of Tsardom of Russia, but initially withdrew his support because of disagreements, and lack of help on restoring Ukraine. But Russia started seeking aid with Somko's opponents, in particular with Ivan Briukhovetsky who supported Russian rule, they in turn started accusing Somko of secret negotiations with Khmelnytsky, and Pavlo Teteria, which caused to delay the final decision of the Cossack starshyna council at Kozelets in 1662 to recognize his tenure as hetman.

In order to decide on a new hetman, a Chorna rada took place on June 17–18, 1663 near Nizhyn, where a cossack council consisting of the starshyna, and a large number of common cossacks elected a new hetman for left-bank Ukraine. The officers proposed him and colonel Vasyl Zolotarenko of the Nizhyn Regiment as candidates, but the majority and including the Tsar supported  Briukhovetsky and elected him the new hetman. Both Somko, and Zolotarenko were imprisoned and then were handed over to Briukhovetsky, who had them executed in Borzna on September 28, 1664.

Legacy 
Yakym Somko is the central character in a novel " The Black Council. Chronicle 1663" (1846) by Panteleimon Kulish.

References
Encyclopedia of Ukraine

1664 deaths
People from Pereiaslav
Acting Hetmans (Ukrainian Cossacks)
Russian people of the Russo-Polish War (1654–1667)
Zaporozhian Cossack military personnel of the Khmelnytsky Uprising
1610s births
Colonels of the Cossack Hetmanate